Statistics of Austrian Staatsliga A in the 1954–55 season.

Overview
It was contested by 14 teams, and First Vienna FC won the championship.

League standings

Results

References
Austria - List of final tables (RSSSF)

Austrian Football Bundesliga seasons
Austria
1954–55 in Austrian football